The 2015 Central American Men's Handball Championship took place in Cartago, Costa Rica from 16 to 20 November. It acts as a qualifying tournament for the 2016 Pan American Men's Handball Championship.

Results

Round robin

Final standing

References

External links
Championship page on PATHF Official Website

Central American Handball Championship
2015 in handball